The 1979–80 Washington Huskies men's basketball team represented the University of Washington for the 1979–80 NCAA Division I men's basketball season. Led by ninth-year head coach Marv Harshman, the Huskies were members of the Pacific-10 Conference and played their home games on campus at Hec Edmundson Pavilion in Seattle, Washington.

There was no conference tournament yet; it debuted seven years later.

This was Washington's first appearance in the National Invitation Tournament, they played  UNLV in the first round and lost by twenty points. The Pac-8 did not allow participation in the NIT until 1973.

Postseason result

|-
!colspan=6 style=| National Invitation Tournament

References

External links
Sports Reference – Washington Huskies: 1979–80 basketball season

Washington Huskies men's basketball seasons
Washington Huskies
Washington
Washington
Washington